Jack Thomas Watts (15 April 1909 – 10 August 1970) was a New Zealand politician of the National Party and the twenty-ninth Minister of Finance, from November 1954 to 12 December 1957, when he retired.

Biography

Early life and career
Watts was born in Palmerston North in 1909. He was educated at Christchurch Boys High School and Canterbury University where he attained a Master of Laws. In 1932 he won the Butterwoth Prize in Law and the Canterbury Law Society Gold Medal. In 1934 he started his own legal practice. In 1937 he married Gwendolyn Irene Grange with whom he had five children.

During World War II Watts served as an officer in the New Zealand Army but did not serve abroad. He was medically discharged from the army in early 1943 due to high blood pressure.

Political career

He was the Member of Parliament for Riccarton 1943–46, then St Albans 1946–57, then Fendalton 1957–60.

During the First National Government, he was Minister of Health and Minister for Social Security in the first Holland Ministry (1949–54), then Minister of Finance and Minister in Charge of the Census and Statistics Department in the second Holland Ministry (1954–57) and in the first Holyoake Ministry of 1957 (plus Minister in Charge of the Inland Revenue Department).

In 1957 he lost a caucus poll to Jack Marshall for the deputy leadership of the National Party (and consequently the position of Deputy Prime Minister). Watts was bitterly disappointed feeling that he (who held a more prominent portfolio and had been in the House for three years longer) should have been chosen. The result was secret and several cabinet ministers privately speculated that Watts had won, but Holyoake overturned the result. Parliamentary colleagues were concerned with Watts' health which may have counted against him in the ballot. He had been hospitalized after suffering a heart attack shortly before the 1954 election and in 1959 he suffered a thrombosis which blinded him temporarily.

After the Government's defeat in the  he became National's spokesperson for finance, trade and marketing and ranked third in caucus while National was in opposition. He decided to retire, however, at the  due to poor health.

In 1953, Watts was awarded the Queen Elizabeth II Coronation Medal.

Later life and death
After exiting politics he resumed his profession as a legal practitioner and was also a member of the board of directors of several commercial companies.

Watts suffered another heart attack and died in Wellington on 10 August 1970. He was buried at Makara Cemetery.

Notes

References

External links 

 1955 photo of Ministerial House, Wellington
 1957 photo

|-

|-

|-

|-

|-

1909 births
1970 deaths
University of Canterbury alumni
New Zealand military personnel of World War II
New Zealand finance ministers
New Zealand National Party MPs
Members of the Cabinet of New Zealand
New Zealand MPs for Christchurch electorates
Members of the New Zealand House of Representatives
20th-century New Zealand politicians
Burials at Makara Cemetery